Krishna-kittur  is a village in the southern state of Karnataka, India. It is located in the Athani taluka of Belgaum district in Karnataka.

Demographics
Krishna Kittur has a population of 7,000, 3,700 male and 3,300 female, as reported in the 2013 and 2015 by Indian censuses.
Krishna Kittur is cover from water three sides of Krishna River, 80% crop is sugar cane here.

See also
 Belgaum
 Districts of Karnataka

References

External links
 Belagavi District
 Mapcarta

Villages in Belagavi district